Babungo or Bamungo may refer to:

Babungo people, an ethnic group
Babungo language, spoken by the Babungo people
Babungo (village), Northwest Region of Cameroon
Babungo Museum, Ndop, Cameroon